The 2022 Charlotte 49ers football team represented the University of North Carolina at Charlotte in the 2022 NCAA Division I FBS football season. The 49ers played their home games at Jerry Richardson Stadium in Charlotte, North Carolina, and competed in Conference USA (C–USA). They were led by fourth-year head coach Will Healy. Charlotte fired Healy after eight games; offensive line coach Peter Rossomando finished out the season.

Previous Season

Charlotte finished the 2021 season 5–7, 3–5 in CUSA play to finish 6th in the East Division. On October 21, 2021, Charlotte accepted an invitation to join the American Athletic Conference (AAC) and will become a full-member on July 1, 2023. 2022 was the 49ers' final season as members of Conference USA.

Coaching Staff

On February 14 tight ends coach Joe Cox left to take the same position at Alabama. On February 16 Healy announced the hiring of Greg Brown as co-defensive coordinator and Kap Dede as secondary coach. At the same time grad assistant Tyler Chadwick was promoted to tight ends coach. Assistant head coach and co-defensive coordinator Marcus West departed the program on February 24 to become the NFL's Buffalo Bills assistant defensive line coach. On March 16 Brian Baker came on board to coach defensive line. On April 7 Cordae Hankton was named running backs coach. 

On October 23, following the 49ers' seventh loss of the season and loss of a chance to participate in a post-season bowl game, 4th year head coach Will Healy was relieved of his head coaching duties. Offensive line coach and former Central Connecticut head football coach Pete Rossomando was named interim head coach. 

On November 15, Michigan associate head coach Biff Poggi was named the 49ers' third head coach of the modern era. Rossomando finished out the season as interim head coach with a Senior Day win over Louisiana Tech.

Recruiting

Position key

Recruiting class
The following recruits and transfers have signed letters of intent or verbally committed to the Charlotte 49ers football program for the 2022 recruiting year.

Key transfers

Roster

Depth chart

Awards and honors

Preseason

In season

Postseason

All Conference Honorable Mentions:

Offense:
QB – Chris Reynolds, R-Sr. • 
WR – Elijah Spencer, So. • 
OL – Ashton Gist, Sr. 

Defense:
DE – Markees Watts, R-Sr. •
CB – Geo Howard, R-Sr.

Special Teams:
KR – Shadrick Byrd, R-So.

Schedule

Television
Charlotte 49ers home games and conference road games were broadcast through Conference USA's television partners ESPN, CBS Sports, and Stadium.

Radio
Radio coverage for all games was broadcast by IMG College through the Charlotte 49ers Radio Network flagship station WZGV ESPN Radio 730 AM The Game, and the TuneIn Charlotte 49ers IMG Sports Network app. The radio announcers were "Voice of the 49ers" Matt Swierad with play-by-play alongside NFL veteran Al Wallace providing color commentary and Bobby Rosinski and Walker Mehl providing sideline reports.

Preseason media poll

The preseason poll was released on July 25, 2022.

Game summaries

Florida Atlantic

Sources:

Game notes:

8th game in the series since 2015, (FAU 6–2).

William & Mary

Sources:

Game notes:

First meeting between these two programs.
Tribe head coach Mike London was 49ers' head coach Will Healy's head coach when he played for the Richmond Spiders.

Maryland

Sources:

Game notes:

First meeting between these two programs.

Georgia State

Sources:

Game notes:

Chris Reynolds' 5 touchdown passes ties the school in-game TD record.
4th game in the series since 2015, (Tied 2–2).

South Carolina

Sources:

Game notes:

First meeting between these two programs.

UTEP

Sources:

Game notes:

UTEP's first win in program history in the Eastern Time Zone.
3rd game in the series since 2019, (CHAR 2–1).

UAB

Sources: 

Game notes:

3rd game in the series since 2017, (UAB 2–1).

FIU

Sources:

Game notes:

With the 7th loss of the season and no possibility of reaching a post-season bowl, Charlotte head coach Will Healy was released after the game.
7th game in the series since 2015, (FIU 6–1).

Rice

Sources:

Game notes:

Pete Rossomando's debut as 49ers' interim head coach would also be his first at the helm of an FBS program and his first FBS win.
Senior Chris Reynolds was named C-USA Offensive Player of the Week.
Sophomore Shadrick Byrd was named C-USA Special Teams Player of the Week.
4th game in the series since 2015, (Tied 2–2).

Western Kentucky

Sources:

Game notes:

6th game in the series since 2017, (WKU 5–1).

Middle Tennessee

Sources:

Game notes:

7th game in the series since 2015, (MTSU 5–2).

Louisiana Tech

Sources:

Game notes:

In his final collegiate game, 6th year senior Chris Reynolds became the first 49ers' passer to cross the 10,000 yard passing mark.
Also in his final collegiate game, senior Calvin Camp crossed the career 1000 yards rushing mark.
Second meeting in the series since 2021, (Tied 1–1).

Attendance

References

Charlotte
Charlotte 49ers football seasons
Charlotte 49ers football